Seng-Athit Somvang (born 2 June 1991) is a Laotian football goalkeeper. He made his first appearance for the Laos national football team in 2010.

References 

1991 births
Living people
Laotian footballers
Laos international footballers
Association football goalkeepers